(born September 25, 1953 in Yamagata) is a retired amateur boxer from Japan, who won the gold medal at the 1974 Asian Games in the men's bantamweight (– 54 kg) division. He represented his native country at the 1976 Summer Olympics in Montreal, Quebec, Canada, falling to eventual bronze medal winner Viktor Rybakov in the third round.

1976 Olympic results
Below ore the results of Hitoshi Ishigaki, a Japanese bantamweight boxer who competed at the 1976 Montreal Olympics:

 Round of 64: bye
 Round of 32: defeated Jozsef Jakab (Hungary) on a second-round disqualification
 Round of 16: lost to Viktor Rybakov (Soviet Union) on points, 0-5

References

1953 births
Living people
Bantamweight boxers
Boxers at the 1976 Summer Olympics
Olympic boxers of Japan
Asian Games medalists in boxing
Boxers at the 1974 Asian Games
Japanese male boxers
Asian Games gold medalists for Japan
Medalists at the 1974 Asian Games